This article covers the socio-political history of Ottoman Empire beginning from its establishment to the reformation efforts of Selim III.

Economy 
Areas of economic surplus, above self-sustaining bases, were few in relation to the area under Ottoman rule. Such areas focused around an urban center surrounded by well tilled arable farmland. Populations and population density was huge where substantial rural to urban migration had occurred; famine, conflict and extortion from tax-farms being the main stimulus for this. Cities, as in Europe, were the focuses of manufacture and trade. Ottoman cities had a large out put of goods, where comprehensive guild systems maintained quality at the expense of competition. However, the main source of Ottoman wealth came from less industry reliant goods and raw materials, mainly items from the east such as silk and gemstones; also the passage of such goods generated revenue due effective taxing measures. In comparison to its neighbors, the Ottoman Empire was immensely wealthy.

The economical problems are reflected on the coins with the decreasing amounts of gold and silver ratios, inflation. The influx of precious metals into Europe from the Americas had played a role in the price increases of the late 16th century in the Ottoman Empire. Traditional industries and trades, which depend on stable economy, had a big hit with the increasing inflation.

Administration
Many official posts required active or previous military experience; Grand Viziers, the equivalent chief ministers of other contemporary nations, often commanded the army in person. Such a social and administrative structure, however, remained effective and efficient in conducting foreign policy, gains in Europe being evidence for this.

See also 
History of Turkey
Ottoman Decline Thesis

References 

Economy of the Ottoman Empire